Henry of Berg, Lord of Windeck (bef. 1247 – 8 March 1290/96) was the son of Adolf VII of Berg and Margaret of Hochstaden.  He was the younger brother of Adolf VIII of Berg and William I of Berg.

From 1271-1281 Henry served as a governor for his brother Adolf who became Count of Berg in 1259.  Henry and his brother Adolf supported John I, Duke of Brabant in his succession war for the Duchy of Limburg, which culminated in the Battle of Worringen in 1288.  Henry resided at Windeck castle, probably as an official of his brother.  Windeck was one of the four main Berg castles, which had come into the possession of Berg by 1247.  Henry is buried with other members of the house of Berg at Altenberg Cathedral.

Family and children
Henry married Agnes of the Mark (German: Agnes von der Mark), daughter of Engelbert I of the Mark and Kunigunde of Blieskastel.  They had six children:

 Adolf
 Henry (died 24 Apr 1310), Canon at Cologne
 Margaret, married Otto IV of Ravensberg, mother of Margaret of Ravensberg, heiress of Berg and Ravensberg
 Kunigunde (1285/86 - aft 1355), Abbess of Gerresheim and Essen
 Elizabeth, married Walram of Heinsberg
 Agnes, nun at Gräfrath

Ancestry

References

External links 
 Lower Rhine Nobility
 Wikipedia.de

1247 births
Saxon nobility
13th-century deaths